On January 29, 2013, a hostage crisis, lasting almost seven days, began in the Wiregrass Region near U.S. Highway 231 in Midland City, Alabama. Jimmy Lee Dykes, a 65-year-old Vietnam War-era veteran, boarded a Dale County school bus, killed the driver, and took a five-year-old boy hostage. On the afternoon of February 4, law enforcement agents entered the bunker, killed Dykes, and rescued the child.

Details

Bus driver slaying
Just after 3:30 p.m., Dykes boarded a Dale County school bus that was stopped in Midland City and told the driver that he wanted to take two children, six and eight years old, both boys, from the bus. The school bus driver, 66-year-old Charles Albert Poland, Jr., refused to let him take the children and challenged Dykes to shoot him. He blocked access to the aisle of the bus while Dykes continued to argue with him.

Dykes fired five shots, killing Poland, and left the bus taking Ethan Gilman, a five-year-old autistic student from Midland City Elementary School, with him. After he had left the bus with Gilman, the students on the bus left through the front door, having to pass by the body of Poland, whom many of them had known for years. Authorities indicated that there was no pre-existing relationship between Dykes and the hostage. Fifteen-year-old Tre' Watts, who was present on the bus, was the first person to call 911; he began the call when Dykes boarded the bus.

Child abduction
After the shooting, Dykes took Gilman to a 6-foot by 8-foot underground bunker on his property. The bunker contained homemade bombs and was equipped with a PVC ventilation pipe. Hostage negotiators cooperated with Dykes in an attempt to obtain Gilman's release and to bring the situation to a favorable conclusion.

Negotiations

Soon after the shooting and abduction, Dykes called 911 and gave instructions on how to communicate with him. FBI hostage negotiators arrived at the bunker and began communicating with Dykes through the ventilation pipe, as he instructed.

Because Gilman had Asperger's syndrome and ADHD, Dykes accepted medication for him, sent through the PVC pipe along with a coloring book and crayons. It was later confirmed that Dykes wanted a female reporter to broadcast him live in the bunker, and that he would commit suicide on live television. Investigators also revealed that he had been "training" Gilman to detonate the improvised explosive devices inside the bunker.

Rescue
On February 4, 2013, at 3:12 p.m. CST, the FBI's Hostage Rescue Team breached the roof of the bunker using explosive charges after negotiations began to break down and they saw, using a hidden camera, Dykes holding a gun. The agents threw stun grenades into the bunker before exchanging gunfire with Dykes, killing him, and rescuing the boy. Gilman was taken to the hospital and was reported to be in good condition. According to sources, two improvised explosive devices were discovered, one inside the PVC pipe, the other inside the bunker.

The perpetrator
Jimmy Dykes, a decorated Vietnam War Navy veteran, was identified as the gunman. He lived in isolation and supposedly lost contact with his two daughters, years before the incident, according to people who lived near him. He previously lived in Florida, where he was arrested for brandishing a gun in 1995. In 2000, he was arrested for marijuana possession charges. He moved to Midland City, where he beat a neighbor's dog to death with an iron pipe when it walked onto his property, warned children not to enter his property, and built a speed bump to prevent motorists from driving too fast down the street. Dykes was also known to have patrolled his property at night with a shotgun and a flashlight. The day prior to the standoff, he was due in court for a hearing on a menacing case in which he allegedly fired a gun at neighbors. Dykes had cleared a path on his property for school buses to take, and he had started speaking to Charles Poland weeks prior to the incident.

Aftermath
The following week, Dr. Phil interviewed Gilman and his mother. On February 26, the bunker where Dykes held him captive was demolished by officials, who stated that it posed "a biological risk". Gilman was later adopted by local Reverend Brandon Turner in 2016 and his name was changed to Ethan Turner, and was reported to be attending elementary school in 2019.

Alabama Code Title 13A. Criminal Code § 13A-7-4.2, known as the Charles "Chuck" Poland, Jr. Act, forbids trespass onto a school bus. It was named for Charles Poland, Jr., the school bus driver killed by Dykes. The act was signed into law by Governor Robert J. Bentley in June 2013.

See also 
 1976 Chowchilla kidnapping
 List of kidnappings
 List of solved missing person cases

References

Bunker hostage crisis
2013 murders in the United States
January 2013 crimes in the United States
February 2013 events in the United States
Attacks in the United States in 2013
Child abduction in the United States
Bunker hostage crisis
Bunker hostage crisis
Bunker hostage crisis
Formerly missing people
Hostage taking in the United States
Kidnapped American children
Missing person cases in Alabama
Bunker hostage crisis